Near the end of 2012, a massive storm complex developed that produced both a tornado outbreak and a blizzard across the southern and eastern United States. On Christmas Day 2012 (December 25), a tornado outbreak occurred across the Southern United States. This severe weather/tornado event affected the United States Gulf Coast and southern East Coast over a two-day span. It occurred in conjunction with a much larger winter storm event that brought blizzard conditions to much of the interior United States. In total, 31 tornadoes were confirmed by the National Weather Service in five states from Texas to North Carolina. All but one of the tornadoes that occurred during the outbreak touched down on December 25, with the other occurring the following day in North Carolina. Two of the tornadoes were destructive enough to be rated EF3 on the Enhanced Fujita Scale. At least 16 people died as a result of the related blizzard, and thousands were without power.

There were 63 preliminary local storm reports received for tornadoes, including 60 in four states on December 25 alone. Significant tornadoes included a long–tracked EF3 that moved across areas of Mississippi and an EF2 that moved through Mobile, Alabama. The Mobile tornado damaged many homes, businesses, a hospital, and a high school, with estimated damages totaling $1.35 million.

Meteorological synopsis

On December 24, the Storm Prediction Center (SPC) issued a moderate risk of severe weather, valid for the following day, as conditions became favorable for severe weather. The moderate risk covered an area stretching from west-central Louisiana to west-central Alabama and was expanded south and west on December 25 to include cities such as Port Arthur, New Orleans, and Mobile.

From a meteorological standpoint, the outbreak was caused by a vigorous upper-level trough that moved southeast into Texas from the Rocky Mountains on the evening of December 24, becoming a powerful, negatively-tilted shortwave trough on December 25. In response to the shortwave trough, a surface low formed over south-central Texas by 1200 UTC that morning. Warm, moist air near the surface flowed northward along a warm front extending east from the surface low along the gulf coast on the morning of December 25. Meanwhile, a cold front and dry line had formed to the southwest of the surface low and advanced eastward through the morning, providing a source of lift for convection to form in eastern Texas. Initially, the convection congealed into a quasi-linear convective system while over northeast Texas and western Louisiana, with only a few tornadoes touching down in these areas. Later in the afternoon, enough energy associated with the advancing shortwave trough allowed for the formation of discrete tornadic supercells ahead of the advancing squall line in Louisiana, southern Mississippi, and southern Alabama, and around the same time, the SPC issued a Particularly Dangerous Situation (PDS) tornado watch for extreme eastern Louisiana, southern and central Mississippi, and western Alabama. Southerly winds near the surface increased, providing strong low-level and deep layer wind shear needed for these cells, which would later produce tornadic activity. By late-evening, most storms had congealed into a squall line and weakened due to waning instability.

In the early morning of December 25, a mix of rain and snow began to develop as the upper-level trough began to interact with low-level moisture from the Gulf of Mexico. The system intensified as it moved across the southern plains and into the Mississippi Valley on Christmas Day. The system was able to pull in cold arctic air, causing snow and freezing rain in the south, leading to a rare "White Christmas" event for that portion of the country. As the system moved through the Tennessee Valley overnight into December 26, heavy snow continued in the Ohio Valley. A number areas in the Ohio Valley region, including Dayton, Ohio and Miamisburg, Ohio, and other locations, like Arkansas, also experienced thundersnow. As the day progressed, the system brought snow into the Great Lakes region, and a new low pressure center began to develop in North Carolina. Environment Canada also reported that the system began impacting Ontario that day, bringing heavy snow to the province. The system moved into the Northeast early December 27, with the upper-level trough moving just off the coast of the Delmarva Peninsula. As the day progressed, the system began to weaken, with the pressure rising, as it continued to move to the northeast, impacting New England, as the system tracked toward the Canadian Maritimes overnight into December 28. That same day, Environment Canada reported heavy and blowing snow over Montreal, Quebec. Early on December 28, the system moved through Nova Scotia, bringing heavy rain and snow before it moved out over the Atlantic Ocean. During the next couple of days, the system slowly moved into the Atlantic Ocean, before accelerating eastward across the Atlantic on December 30. On December 31, the winter storm was absorbed by another extratropical cyclone, just northwest of the United Kingdom.

Confirmed tornadoes

McNeill–Maxie–McLain, Mississippi

This strong and long-tracked EF3 tornado touched down in Pearl River County, just southwest of McNeill where it downed several trees at EF0 to EF1 intensity along Harris Road. It then rapidly intensified to high-end EF2 strength as it impacted the western edge of McNeill, where many trees were snapped and multiple homes were heavily damaged or destroyed. A small wood-frame home along Joe Smith Road was left with only a few walls standing, and an elderly woman was critically injured inside. A nearby brick home had its roof torn off, and a strong velocity couplet and debris ball had become visible on Doppler weather radar by this time. The tornado reached its peak strength of EF3 as it crossed Stones Chapel Road at the north edge of town, where it destroyed a single-story brick triplex, with only two interior walls left standing. A nearby home was heavily damaged at EF2 strength, and a few others sustained lesser damage in the area. One house in McNeill that was damaged beyond repair had survived effects from both Hurricane Camille and Hurricane Katrina. It then weakened back to EF2 strength as it crossed U.S. Route 11, snapping numerous trees and tearing the roofs off of some homes. The tornado weakened further and crossed Interstate 59, moving through unpopulated rural areas southeast of Poplarville, causing EF0 to EF1 tree and outbuilding damage. The tornado then struck a house at EF1 strength near the Stone County line, causing heavy roof damage. Eight people were injured in Pearl River County, 22 homes were destroyed or damaged beyond repair, eight had major damage, 16 had minor damage, and an additional nine were affected in some way. The tornado strengthened to EF2 intensity again as it entered Stone County west of Texas, and caused significant damage to a few homes. Numerous pine trees were snapped at a campground in this area, and a manufactured home was destroyed. Another manufactured home was rolled into a frame house and several more trees were downed before the tornado moved out of Stone County.

Two additional double-wide mobile homes were severely damaged, a single-wide mobile home also sustained major damage, and a falling tree demolished a travel trailer. Four people were injured in Forrest County. The tornado momentarily weakened to EF1 intensity as it crossed into Perry County and moved through portions of the DeSoto National Forest, downing many trees. A house sustained considerable roof and window damage, outbuildings were destroyed, and two cars were moved along this segment of the path. It quickly regained EF2 status as it crossed Mississippi Highway 29 and snapped several wooden electrical transmission poles. The tornado then destroyed a manufactured home and a hunting camp before weakening back to EF1 status, damaging a few homes, and downing many more trees. The tornado then crossed into Greene County and made a direct hit on the small town of McLain as an EF1, causing roof damage to an elementary school and a few homes. Damage to signs and the siding of a church also occurred. It also downed several trees before lifting as it exited McLain.

Mobile–Prichard, Alabama

This large, wedge-shaped EF2 tornado was broadcast live on local television news tower cameras as it moved through Mobile. The tornado initially touched down at 2254 UTC (4:54 p.m. CST) in the northern part of the Mertz neighborhood of Mobile, just northwest of Interstate 10. The tornado initially produced EF0 damage in neighborhoods along Holcomb Avenue as it moved due north. Damage along this portion of the path consisted of snapped tree limbs, along with minor damage to a fence and a metal building. The tornado began to strengthen and grow in size as it approached and moved through the intersection of Government Street and the Dauphin Island Parkway. EF1 damage occurred in this area as multiple homes sustained roof damage and broken windows, trees and power lines were downed, and several businesses sustained considerable damage. One business sustained outward collapse of an exterior wall, and a brick structure sustained major damage to its second floor. The tornado then reached EF2 strength as it crossed Clearmont Street and struck Murphy High School, which sustained significant damage. Damage at the high school included many broken windows, six portable classrooms being completely destroyed, the roofs being torn off of the auditorium and band building, and other large portions of roof being lifted off the building, only to be deposited back onto the structure. A metal-framed outbuilding was completely destroyed near the athletic field as well. The tornado continued northward and inflicted EF2 damage to several homes and Trinity Episcopal Church. At the church, part of a new slate roof was blown into the parking lot and a large portion of an exterior brick wall was knocked out, leaving a portion of the building visible from the outside. Homes in surrounding neighborhoods had their roofs torn off, large trees were snapped and uprooted, and gas leaks were reported in the area. The tornado widened to its widest point of  along this portion of the path.

The tornado continued to the north at EF2 intensity, ripping roofs off of homes as it crossed Springhill Avenue. By this point, a tornado emergency was declared for areas of Downtown Mobile at 2300 UTC (5:00 p.m. CST) as the large tornado approached those areas, stating Midtown Mobile, Downtown Mobile, and Prichard, Alabama as potentially affected areas. The tornado then weakened slightly to high-end EF1 strength, damaged several more homes, and blew out windows at Mobile Infirmary Medical Center, a hospital of more than 500 beds. Automobiles in the parking lot at the hospital were damaged, with one being flipped. It continued through the Allenville neighborhood, across Interstate 165 and into Prichard. Damage along this segment of the path ranged from mid-range to high-end EF1, as multiple small homes and apartment buildings were damaged, some of which sustained roof loss. It also tossed several shipping containers and damaged a warehouse facility, before producing additional minor EF0 damage in the Plateau neighborhood of Prichard and then lifting. Many trees and power lines were downed along the path, which totaled . Several people suffered minor injuries. While only existing for eleven minutes, damage estimates to the cities of Mobile and Prichard totaled out at $1.35 million.

The tornado followed a path just east of the weaker EF1 December 20 tornado, which also impacted Mobile.

Impact

Southeast and Midwest United States

In Arkansas, two people were killed in a highway accident as a result of sleet on the roads. One person was killed when high winds knocked over a tree onto a house. Freezing rain was blamed for a 21-car pileup on Interstate 35 near Oklahoma City. 40 Oklahoma National Guard soldiers were deployed throughout the state to assist motorists on roads. Two people were killed in separate weather-related car crashes. The driver of a truck was killed in Texas when strong winds knocked over a tree, which fell on the vehicle. Two people were killed in separate weather-related automobile accidents in Virginia.

The National Weather Service issued a blizzard warning for southern Illinois, the first blizzard warning in history for the region. Several counties also closed their courthouses due to the snow. Two people were killed in a traffic accident in Indiana caused by snowy roads on December 26, including an 18-year-old Ohio girl that lost control of her vehicle due to poor road conditions and crashed into a snow plow. Due to the snow, a game between the Indianapolis Pacers and Chicago Bulls was postponed until February 4, 2013.

Northeast United States and Canada
A Southwest Airlines jet slid off its taxiway and got stuck in mud on the morning of December 27. There were no injuries on board, and the passengers and crew all took a later flight to their destination. A man was killed in a car accident while checking on a disabled vehicle along Interstate 78 near Allentown, Pennsylvania. On Wednesday evening, an American Airlines flight that had safely landed at Pittsburgh International Airport ran over a patch of snow on the tarmac and got stuck for approximately two hours. Nobody was injured in the incident.

Over 200 flights were cancelled at Toronto Pearson International Airport. Several pedestrian and car accidents were reported. A record setting  of snow fell over the Montreal-Laval, Quebec area. The previous record snowfall occurred 41 years earlier in March 1971 when  had fallen.  Numerous road accidents were reported throughout the province, including a 15-vehicle pileup near Saint-Cuthbert, Quebec.

Aftermath

Louisiana
In Alexandria, after a relatively short-lived EF2, utility/public works crews and police and fire personnel were dispatched around the city to aid in the cleanup. Within 12 hours of the tornado hitting, nearly 100% of the power had been restored and all streets were clear of hazardous debris.

In Tioga, after another EF2 tornado, neighbors, friends, and family of victims aided in the cleanup across town. Many homes and other structures were damaged and there were many volunteers ready to help victims of the tornado. Power was out in the area for at least two days. A Cenla man partnered with the American Red Cross in an effort to raise at least $10,000 for storm victims across the area.

Mississippi
Mississippi governor Phil Bryant declared a state of emergency for eight counties in the southern part of the state. These counties were: Pearl River, Forrest, Greene, Hinds, Jones, Lawrence, Wilkinson, and Stone.

Many donations were brought to the McNeill, Mississippi VFD building for victims of the EF3 tornado in Pearl River County. These donations came from citizens and businesses of many surrounding areas, such as Gulfport, Mississippi and Slidell, Louisiana. Items such as toiletries and yard supplies (shovels, rakes, etc.) were provided by the Sam's Club and Tractor Supply stores in Slidell. Many articles of clothing as well as many other supplies were donated as well. In neighboring Stone County, many people pitched in to help with the cleanup in the affected areas. Stone County was affected by the same tornado that hit McNeill.

Alabama
In Mobile and Prichard, volunteers distributed bottled water, yard supplies, and clean-up kits to people who were affected by the EF2 tornado in that area. Tarps were provided as well for houses that suffered roof damage. Murphy High School students were transferred to nearby Clark-Shaw Magnet School to finish out the school year as repairs were being made to Murphy High. The Salvation Army provided food for more than 1,000 people in Mobile, as well as people affected by the EF2 tornado near Troy.

The Mobile Infirmary was damaged and, with no power, was relegated to using generators. Across the state, 27,600 Alabama Power customers were left without electricity, with approximately 23,000 of those in the Mobile area.

A local block party and concert took place at a school in Mobile on January 4, 2013. Everything for the party, including the food, a bounce house, and the music, was donated. All proceeds went to local Catholic Social Services and the American Red Cross to be distributed to Mobile families to help rebuild after the tornado.

See also
List of North American tornadoes and tornado outbreaks
2010 New Year's Eve tornado outbreak
November 2012 nor'easter
December 17–22, 2012 North American blizzard

Notes

References

2012 meteorology
2012 natural disasters in the United States
2012 natural disasters
Weather events in Canada
Blizzards in Canada
2012-123
Tornadoes of 2012
Tornadoes in Texas
Tornadoes in Mississippi
Tornadoes in Alabama
Tornadoes in Louisiana
Tornadoes in North Carolina
Christmas Day tornado outbreak, 2012
2012 disasters in Canada
December 2012 events in North America
Natural disasters in Texas
Natural disasters in Vermont
Natural disasters in Mississippi